Scelotes bidigittatus, the Lowveld dwarf burrowing skink, is a species of lizard which is found in South Africa and Mozambique.

References

bidigittatus
Reptiles of South Africa
Reptiles described in 1930
Taxa named by Vivian Frederick Maynard FitzSimons